The Great CityGames is a major street athletics event held twice annually in Manchester, Newcastle and Gateshead.

The former is held in conjunction to the Great Manchester Run, a major 10k generally held on the Sunday. The first event was in May 2009.

The latter is held in conjunction to the Great North Run, a major half marathon attracting world-famous athletes. The first event was in September 2009.

The event was originally designed to promote the Great Runs, however, the Games soon became a major British athletics event, attracting famous athletes such as Usain Bolt, David Rudisha and Kim Collins.

Events at the Manchester Games

Men's

Women's

Mixed

References 



Athletics competitions in England
Athletics in Greater Manchester
Sport in Newcastle upon Tyne
Sport in Gateshead
Sports competitions in Manchester
Recurring sporting events established in 2009
2009 establishments in England